John Nields could refer to:

John Percy Nields (1868–1943), American jurist
John W. Nields Jr. (born 1942), American lawyer